The 2014 Toronto Argonauts season was their 57th season in the Canadian Football League and their 142nd season overall. The Argonauts finished in third place in the East Division but missed out on a playoff spot due to the crossover rule. The 9–9 BC Lions, fourth place in the West Division, had a better record and therefore eliminated the Argos from the playoffs.

Entering the final game of the season at 7–10 against the Ottawa Redblacks, the Argos needed to win to keep their playoff hopes alive, which they did. They also needed Hamilton to lose to Montreal for the Argos to finish second and make the playoffs ahead of the crossover team, the BC Lions. However, the Ti-Cats won that game, eliminating the Argos from the playoffs on the last day of the regular season.

Offseason

CFL draft 
The 2014 CFL Draft took place on May 13, 2014. The Argonauts had eight selections in the seven-round draft. They concluded a trade with the Edmonton Eskimos to secure the third overall pick, enabling them to draft Anthony Coombs. That trade saw their second round selection go to Edmonton in exchange for another third round selection.

Preseason 

 Games played with white uniforms.

Regular season

Standings 

Toronto missed the playoffs, as a third-place team having an inferior record to the fourth-place team in the other division, the 9-9 BC Lions.

Schedule 
 Win
 Loss
 Tie

 Games played with colour uniforms.
 Games played with white uniforms.
 Games played with alternate uniforms.

Team

Roster

Coaching staff

References 

Toronto Argonauts seasons
2014 Canadian Football League season by team
Toronto Argonauts season